Alexander Kerst (23 February 1924 – 9 December 2010) was an Austrian television actor.

He was born in Kralupy nad Vltavou, Czechoslovakia and died in Munich, Germany.

Selected filmography

References

External links

Erna Baumbauer Management 
Short Biography 

1924 births
2010 deaths
Austrian male television actors
20th-century Austrian male actors
German Bohemian people
Naturalised citizens of Austria
People from Kralupy nad Vltavou